Vice Admiral Sir Ian Fergus Corder,  (born 6 August 1960) is a retired senior Royal Navy officer who served as UK Military Representative to NATO, and was the Lieutenant Governor of Guernsey from 2016 to 2021.

Naval career

Educated at Rugby School and Peterhouse, Cambridge, Corder joined the Royal Navy in 1978. He commanded the submarine , then the submarine  and finally the frigate . He went on to become Naval Assistant to the First Sea Lord, Deputy Director of the unit at the Ministry of Defence responsible for policy regarding NATO, the European Union and the United Nations and then Chief of the Strategic Systems Executive. After that he became Director of Naval Personnel Strategy and then Deputy Commander Naval Striking and Support Forces NATO before becoming Commander Operations and Rear Admiral, Submarines in March 2011 and in that capacity he was the UK's Maritime Commander for operations over Libya (Operation Ellamy) in Spring 2011. He attended the wedding of Prince William and Catherine Middleton in April 2011. He went on to be UK Military Representative to NATO in May 2013.

Corder retired from the Royal Navy on 1 July 2016.

He was elected an Honorary Fellow of Peterhouse, Cambridge in 2016.

Lieutenant Governor of Guernsey

In March 2016 Corder was announced as the next Lieutenant Governor of Guernsey, to assume the post by May.

He was appointed a Knight Commander of the Order of the British Empire (KBE) in the 2016 Birthday Honours.

References

|-

|-

1960 births
Living people
Royal Navy vice admirals
People educated at Rugby School
Military personnel from Warwickshire
Alumni of Peterhouse, Cambridge
Companions of the Order of the Bath
Knights Commander of the Order of the British Empire
People from Nuneaton